La petite Rivière (in English: The Little River) is a tributary of Grand lac Saint François which constitutes the head lake of Saint-François River. The course of "La petite Rivière" crosses the territory of the municipality of Lambton, in the Le Granit Regional County Municipality, in the administrative region of Estrie, on the South Shore of the St. Lawrence River, in Quebec, Canada.

Geography 

The main hydrographic slopes near "La petite Rivière" are:
 north side: rivière aux Bluets (Grand lac Saint François), rivière aux Bluets Sud;
 east side: rivière aux Bluets (Grand lac Saint François), Champagne stream;
 south side: Sauvage River (Felton River tributary), brook de la Languette, brook Rouge;
 west side: Grand lac Saint François.

"La Petite Rivière" has its source in an agricultural zone in the 3e rang, east of the village of Lambton, south of route 108, west of fourth rang road, west of the head of Champagne brook (a tributary of the rivière aux Bluets (Grand lac Saint François).

Its route is generally in an agricultural zone, except in the head zone and the forest islets it crosses.

Toponymy 

The toponym "La petite Rivière" was officially registered on August 4, 1969, at the Commission de toponymie du Québec.

See also 
 List of rivers of Quebec

References 

Le Granit Regional County Municipality
Rivers of Estrie